As Quatro Estações ao Vivo is the third live album by Brazilian rock band Legião Urbana, released in 2004. It is the fifth posthumous album by the band following vocalist, acoustic guitarist and keyboardist Renato Russo's death in 1996.

It was recorded in São Paulo, at Palestra Itália Stadium on August 11 and 12, 1990, during their As Quatro Estações tour, except for "Se Fiquei Esperando Meu Amor Passar", recorded at the Mineirinho gymnasium in Belo Horizonte a couple of months before as part of the same tour.

Both shows' audios were recorded straight from the sound table, something new and rare at the time. The tapes were recovered by journalist Marcelo Froés only a decade later and the project was managed by Jorge Davidson, who returned to EMI Music as artistic manager. The living members of the band (Dado Villa-Lobos (guitar) and Marcelo Bonfá (drums), as well as the band's manager Rafael Borges, reunited to direct the creation of the album.

The album was released without Russo's family authorization; his father, also called Renato, died in the middle of production.

Song and show information 
During the performances, Russo made several critical comments about then president of Brazil, Fernando Collor de Mello, but most ended up cut from the album. A particular comment was kept on "1965 (Duas Tribos)", one in which he draws subtle criticism towards the Brazilian military dictatorship at the end of "O Reggae" and a critical comment about the then recently started Gulf War at the opening of the album, right before "Fábrica". According to Froés, the family didn't approve of the removal of such comments, since they considered such interaction with he public his most peculiar element on stage.

Before playing "Pais e Filhos", Russo answered to a comment from Paulinho Moska, who had said the day before that "Uma Barata Chamada Kafka" (A Cockroach Called Kafka), a song by his band Inimigos do Rei, was as good as "Pais e Filhos": "[...] this song is dedicated to all the people who think cockroaches are more important than the person we love".

The second disc opens with Russo commanding the band's sound check and ends with ""Índios"", followed by ten minutes of silence and an encore of "Faroeste Caboclo".

Track listing

Disc 1 
Writing credits per source:

Disc 2 
Writing credits per source:

Personnel 
Source:

Legião Urbana 
 Renato Russo - vocals
 Dado Villa-Lobos - guitars
 Marcelo Bonfá - drums and percussion

Supporting musicians 
 Bruno Araújo - bass guitar
 Fred Nascimento - acoustic guitar
 Mú Carvalho - keyboards

Sales and certifications

References

 

Legião Urbana albums
2004 live albums